Barberini–Fontana di Trevi is an underground station on Line A of the Rome Metro, inaugurated in 1980 and situated under Piazza Barberini in Trevi. Originally, the station was simply named Barberini, and the name was extended in 2000.

The entrance hall of the station accommodates some mosaics of the Rome Artemetro Prize. The creators of the displayed mosaics are Graziano Navy and Heinz Mark.

The station was closed on 21 March 2019 after a fault was experienced on the escalators. A partial reopening of the station was planned for 8 December 2019 but it did not take place. in January 2020 local authorities reported that an escalator had failed a safety check, further delaying the station's reopening.

Services
This station has:
 Escalators

Located nearby
Piazza Barberini
Fontana del Tritone
Fontana delle Api
Via Veneto
Santa Maria della Concezione in Campo Marzio
Via del Tritone
Via Bissolati
Via Barberini
Via Sistina
Via delle Quattro Fontane
Quirinale
Quirinal Palace
Palazzo Barberini
Le Quattro Fontane
Piazza del Quirinale
Trevi Fountain
Santi Vincenzo e Anastasio, with the tomb of Pinelli
Piazza San Bernardo
Piazza San Silvestro
Piazza Santi Apostoli
Madonna dell'Archetto
Palazzo del Bufalo
Santa Maria in Trivio
Santa Maria in Via

References

External links

 Barberini station on the Rome public transport site (in Italian)

Rome Metro Line A stations
Railway stations opened in 1980
1980 establishments in Italy
Rome R. II Trevi
Rome R. III Colonna
Railway stations in Italy opened in the 20th century